Scarborough High School is a high school (9–12) located in Scarborough, Maine, United States. The student population is approximately 1002 students and another 150 staff members.

History
The first high school in Scarborough was built in 1927 and was named after Elwood G. Bessey, a former principal, and the current high school was built in 1954.

In January 2013 principal Auriemma officially stepped down as Principal of Scarborough High School. “This is very hard. It is the best job I ever had, but life is not just about a job,” Auriemma said. “I’ll have a lot of jobs in my life, but only one family.” Entwistle noted as a result of Auriemma stepping down, assistant principals Susan Ketch and Ray Dunn, Athletic Director Mike LeGage and Monique Culbertson, the district's director of curriculum and instruction, will form a leadership team to take over day-to-day operations at the high school. Entwistle said Culbertson will lead that effort, while other district personnel will cover “her job responsibilities related to curriculum and instruction.”

Athletics
Scarborough High School offers 26 Varsity teams in 17 sports, with junior varsity/or and freshmen teams in 11 sports. Some regarding too: soccer, indoor/outdoor track, cross country, baseball, softball, hockey, boys/girls lacrosse, and many others. In 2017 the school won State Championship for football, golf, and girls volleyball.

U.S. News & World Report
As of 2020, Scarborough High School is ranked 12th within Maine. Students have the opportunity to take Advanced Placement® course work and exams. The AP® participation rate at Scarborough High School is 45%. The graduation rate is 96%. The student body makeup is 53% male and 47% female, and the total minority enrollment is 7%. Scarborough High School is the only high school in the Scarborough School Department.

References 

 http://www.scarborough.k12.me.us/Highschool/Documents/mission.htm

External links 
 Scarborough High School webpage

Public high schools in Maine
High schools in Cumberland County, Maine
Buildings and structures in Scarborough, Maine